Scopula angusticallis  is a moth of the  family Geometridae. It is found on the Marquesas Archipelago.

References

Moths described in 1935
Taxa named by Louis Beethoven Prout
angusticallis
Moths of Oceania